The Fifth Michigan Territorial Council was a meeting of the legislative body governing Michigan Territory, known formally as the Legislative Council of the Territory of Michigan. The council met in Detroit in two regular sessions between May 1, 1832, and April 23, 1833, during the term of George B. Porter as territorial governor.

Leadership and organization 

John McDonell was president of the council, Edmund A. Brush secretary, and James T. Allen sergeant-at-arms.

Members 

A January 1827 act of the United States Congress provided for the direct election of a 13-member legislative council by the people of the territory; the same act gave the council responsibility for determining the apportionment of seats.
The council apportioned the seats as follows in an 1828 act:

Notes

References 
 
 
 
 

005
1832 in Michigan Territory
1833 in Michigan Territory
Michigan
Michigan